Manouba is a city in north-eastern Tunisia, and is part the metropolitan area of Tunis, also called "Grand Tunis". It is the capital city of Manouba Governorate.

Manouba is well known for its university. It is also often viewed as a desirable place for family life because of its security, availability of various services and its high level of education.

Historically, Manouba is noted as the birthplace of the sufi saint Sayyida ʿĀʾisha al-Mannūbiyya (1199–1267 CE), and until 2012 the city contained a shrine to her, supposedly her father's house. It was customary in the nineteenth and early twentieth centuries, for the Beys of Tunis to make a ritual circuit of city's the great shrines on the 27th day of Ramaḍān (laylat al-Qadr) and visit this shrine. More recently, 'up until the Tunisian revolution of January 2011, once a week, on Sundays or Mondays, rituals were held ... During the day, the shrines were women's space, devoted to music and trance rituals. At night, they became men's space, dedicated to Ṣūfī ceremonies (dhikr ...)'. However, on 6 October 2012, the shrine was burned down by religious extremists, thought to be young Salafis; ʿĀʾisha's catafalque was entirely destroyed.

References

Populated places in Tunisia
Communes of Tunisia